In Greek mythology, Xanthe (Ancient Greek: Ξανθή or Ξάνθη Xanthê means 'blond-haired') or Xantho may refer to the following divinity and women:

 Xanthe, one of the 3,000 Oceanids, water-nymph daughters of the Titans Oceanus and his sister-wife Tethys.
 Xantho, one of the 50 Nereids, sea-nymph daughters of the 'Old Man of the Sea' Nereus and the Oceanid Doris.
 Xanthe, wife of Asclepius.
 Xanthe, one of the Amazons.
Xantho, one of the maenads named in a vase painting.

Notes

References 

 Gaius Julius Hyginus, Fabulae from The Myths of Hyginus translated and edited by Mary Grant. University of Kansas Publications in Humanistic Studies. Online version at the Topos Text Project.
 Hesiod, Theogony from The Homeric Hymns and Homerica with an English Translation by Hugh G. Evelyn-White, Cambridge, MA.,Harvard University Press; London, William Heinemann Ltd. 1914. Online version at the Perseus Digital Library. Greek text available from the same website.
 Publius Vergilius Maro, Bucolics, Aeneid, and Georgics of Vergil. J. B. Greenough. Boston. Ginn & Co. 1900. Online version at the Perseus Digital Library.

Oceanids
Nereids
Amazons (Greek mythology)
Maenads
Companions of Dionysus